The 2012 Victorian Premier League was the one-hundredth season of the top tier of club football in Victoria. The home and away season commenced on 23 March 2012. Green Gully were the defending champions. Dandenong Thunder defeated Oakleigh Cannons in the Grand Final, becoming the first side in thirty one years to secure a Victorian football treble, having won the State Knockout Cup, VPL League Title and their first VPL Grand Final this year.

Teams

On 16 December 2011, Whittlesea Zebras announced it would change its name to Moreland Zebras effective this season.

Promotion and relegation 

Teams promoted from Victorian State League Division 1:
(After the end of the 2011 season.)

 Whittlesea Zebras (champions)
 Southern Stars FC (runners-up)

Teams relegated to Victorian State League Division 1:
(After the end of the 2011 season.)

 Springvale White Eagles (11th)
 St Albans Saints (12th)

Regular season
The Victorian Premier League 2012 season was played over 22 rounds, beginning on 23 March and concluding on 16 September 2012, followed by the final series.

Finals

Finals Week 1

Finals Week 2

Finals Week 3

Grand Final

Top goalscorers

See also
Victorian Premier League
Football Federation Victoria

References

Victorian Premier League seasons
Victorian Premier League, 2012
2012 domestic association football leagues